The 2015 South American Championships in Athletics was the 49th edition of the biennial athletics competition between South American nations. The event was held in the Peruvian capital of Lima from 12 to 14 June at the Videna Stadium. It was the eighth time Lima hosted the event, having last done so for the 2009 edition. A total of 44 events were held, evenly divided between the sexes, continuing with the event programme established in 2001.

Brazil topped both the medal and points tables, with 11 golds, 34 medals, and 285 points. This extended the nation's unbeaten run at the tournament to 22 editions, having last lost in 1974. Colombia and Venezuela were clear as the next most successful nations, each gathering 22 medals; Colombia ranked second on medals with nine gold and Venezuela ranked second on points with 228. Brazil won both the men's and women's team titles, with Venezuela coming second in the women's rankings and Colombia runner-up in the men's.

Sandra Arenas of Colombia provided the highlight performance of the meeting with a South American record of 1:31:02.3 hours—a 42-second improvement—to defend her 20,000 m racewalk title. A total of nine championship records were improved. Colombians Gerald Giraldo (men's steeplechase), Muriel Coneo (women's 1500 m) and Evelis Jazmín Aguilar (heptathlon) made it four records for their nation. Brazil's field athletes set two championship records through men's javelin thrower Júlio César de Oliveira and women's discus thrower Andressa de Morais. Ecuador's Bayron Piedra (men's 10,000 m) and Déborah Rodríguez of Uruguay (women's 400 m hurdles) rounded out the eight record breakers. A total of sixteen national records in athletics were also improved at the competition.

Two athletes completed individual doubles at the championships, both women. Muriel Coneo of Colombia won both the 1500 metres and 3000 metres steeplechase titles – a feat she had managed at the 2014 South American Games. Uruguay's Déborah Rodríguez did a shorter flat and barriers combination by winning the 800 metres and 400 metres hurdles, both in a national record time. Venezuelan women's sprint duo Nediam Vargas and Nercely Soto each won four medals, reaching both individual and relay podiums and including a gold medal from each. All winners at the competition gained qualification in their event for the 2015 World Championships in Athletics, in line with new IAAF rules.

Medal summary

Men

 Uruguay's Javier Marmo set a national record of 1:49.16 minutes while placing fourth in the men's 800 metres.

Women

 The Peruvian 4 × 400 m relay team (Deysi Lisbeth Parra, Claudia Angelica Meneses Lopez, Jimena Judith Copara Gorvea, Maitte De La Flor Torres Cordova) set a national record of 3:44.44 minutes in fifth place.
 Peru's women's long jump winner Paola Mautino set a wind-legal national record in the final with a jump of 6.48 m.
 The winning performance of 60.16 m by Jucilene de Lima in the women's javelin was declared a championship record by CONSUDATLE, but was actually short of Flor Ruiz's mark of 60.23 m set at the 2013 edition.

Medal table

Points tables

Participation
Twelve of the 13 member federations of CONSUDATLE participated at the championships, plus ODESUR member Aruba. Guyana did not compete at this edition, having done so at the 2013 South American Championships in Athletics.

See also
2015 Asian Athletics Championships

References

Individual results
Campeonato Sudamericano Mayores Lima 2015. CONSUDATLE. Retrieved on 2015-06-20.
Medal and points tables
Medallero Final Totales. CONSUDATLE. Retrieved on 2015-06-20.
Puntaje Final Totales. CONSUDATLE. Retrieved on 2015-06-20.

External links

South American Championships in Athletics
International athletics competitions hosted by Peru
Sports competitions in Lima
South American Championships in Athletics
South American Championships in Athletics
Athletics Championships